The von Wright family is a Swedish and Finnish noble family founded by the Scotsman George Wright, who emigrated from Dundee to Narva in Swedish-ruled Estonia, in the mid-17th century, Wright's grandsons (and their descendants) by his son Henrik would go by the nobility particle von Wright.

Notable members 
 Von Wright brothers, scientists, nature illustrators and artists
 Magnus von Wright (1805–1868)
 Wilhelm von Wright (1810–1887)
 Ferdinand von Wright (1822–1906)
 Georg Henrik von Wright (1916 – 2003), philosopher
 Moira von Wright (born 1957), academic

See also
Von Wright brothers

References

Swedish noble families
Finnish noble families
Scottish diaspora
Families of Scottish ancestry
Swedish families of Scottish ancestry
Finnish people of Scottish descent